Nepal is a landlocked central Himalayan country in South Asia. It has a population of 26.4 million and is the 93rd largest country by area. Kathmandu is the nation's capital and largest city.

Nepal's gross domestic product (GDP) for 2012 was estimated at over $17.921 billion (adjusted to nominal GDP). In 2010, agriculture accounted for 36.1%, services comprised 48.5%, and industry 15.4% of Nepal's GDP. While agriculture and industry are contracting, the contribution by the service sector is increasing.

For further information on the types of business entities in this country and their abbreviations, see "Business entities in Nepal".

Notable firms 
This list includes notable companies with primary headquarters located in the country. The industry and sector follow the Industry Classification Benchmark taxonomy. Organizations which have ceased operations are included and noted as defunct.

See also 
 List of airlines of Nepal
 List of banks in Nepal

References 

Nepal